Nakane is a Japanese surname. Notable people with the surname include:

Arthur Nakane (born 1937), Los Angeles-based street musician and screenwriter, subject of the documentary film Secret Asian Man
Chie Nakane (born 1926), Japanese author and anthropologist
, Japanese model, gravure idol and actress
Kazuyuki Nakane (born 1969), Japanese politician serving in the House of Representatives in the Diet
Nakane Kōtei (1839–1913), Japanese writer who lived during the late Edo Period and early Meiji Era

See also
Nakane Station

Japanese-language surnames